David King (born 13 June 1994) is an English Olympic athlete specialising in the high hurdles. He represented Team GB at the Tokyo 2020 Olympics (held in 2021), made the semi-finals finishing 19th overall. He is currently based in Phoenix, Arizona, and trains with Phoenix Track Club under Coach Tim O'Neil. 

At the 2022 World Athletics Indoor Championships, David advanced to the final after successfully winning a draw of lots and finished 6th in the final. In the semi-finals, David and Japanese athlete, Shusei Nomoto, tied for the final non-automatic qualifying position with a time of 7.565. As there were no additional lanes available, a drawing of lots took place which saw David advance to the final as a result of his race bib labelled "King" being randomly drawn from a bag.

David is a three times British champion over 110 metres hurdles (2017, 2019, 2020) and three times British champion over the 60 metres hurdles (2019, 2020, 2023) 

His personal bests are 13.37 seconds in the 110 metres hurdles (Turku 2021) and 7.57 seconds in the 60 metres hurdles (Madrid, 2022).

International competitions

1Did not start in the semifinals

References

1994 births
Living people
Sportspeople from Plymouth, Devon
English male hurdlers
British male hurdlers
Commonwealth Games competitors for England
Athletes (track and field) at the 2018 Commonwealth Games
World Athletics Championships athletes for Great Britain
British Athletics Championships winners
Athletes (track and field) at the 2020 Summer Olympics
Olympic athletes of Great Britain